The H type Adelaide tram was a class of 30 trams built by A Pengelly & Co, Adelaide in 1929 for use on the newly constructed Glenelg tram line. They remained in regular revenue service until replaced by Bombardier Flexity Classic trams in 2006.

Overview

The 30 H type (numbers 351 - 380) were built locally by A Pengelly & Co in 1929 to operate the newly converted Glenelg tram line which opened on 14 December 1929. They were also used on the Henley North line from 1935 and though to Kensington Gardens after these lines were through-routed in 1952. The H type regularly ran as double sets at busier times. All services were operated by a crew of driver and conductor (driver and two conductors on coupled sets).

They have many of the characteristics of American interurban streetcars of that period and their heritage ambience has been carefully maintained. Although the H type trams have been through several refurbishment programmes over the years (incorporating more up-to-date features like safety glass, fluorescent lighting and upgraded bogies), they still retain varnished wood and etched glass interiors, a classic tuscan red and cream exterior colour scheme and neither heating nor air-conditioning in the passenger saloons. Between 1952 and 1956 all were repainted silver and carnation red, before being returned to tuscan red from 1971 with the last repainted in 1986. In 1986, the trolley poles were replaced with pantographs.

In 1968, 366 and 377 were deemed surplus and scrapped. At the time, for operations management reasons all were run in coupled pairs, with an odd-numbered car being coupled to the next even-numbered car. This sometimes required cars to be re-numbered. Thus 353 and 354 were renumbered 377 and 366 to be married with 378 and 365 respectively.

The H type were the longest rigid-body trams remaining in service in Australia, and the second-longest ever built. They travelled in pairs during peak times, and with the retirement of the W2 trams from Melbourne's network were the oldest passenger trams in service in Australia.

In November 1990, 378 was fitted out as a restaurant car being repainted royal blue with gold lining. On 15 July 2000, 372 was used to convey the Olympic flame from Glenelg to Morphettville as part of the 2000 Summer Olympics torch relay.

Replacement
Most of the H type trams were replaced during 2006 by new Bombardier Flexity Classic trams. However, five H-class (351, 367, 370, 374 and 380) were refurbished in 2000, with the intention of retaining these cars for special weekend and holiday operations. By 2012, only 351 and 367 remained; the other three were stored at Mitsubishi Motors Australia's Clovelly Park plant.

In 2012, 351 was restored in tuscan red by Bluebird Rail Operations at Islington Railway Workshops and briefly operated weekend services in August 2013. In December 2013, 352 returned from overhaul by Bluebird Rail Operations painted silver and carnation red. The only other recorded use of the pair was in February 2015, when they operated a charter. The final charter run was by 352 in December 2015.

To make room for new Alstom Citadis trams at the Glengowrie depot, in December 2017 both were moved to the Department of Planning, Transport & Infrastructure's Walkley Heights facility. In 2021 they were donated to the Tramway Museum, St Kilda and transferred there as the sixth and seventh H cars on site.

Preservation
Several have been preserved:
357 and 358 by the Sydney Tramway Museum
351, 360, 362, 364, 365, 367 and 378 by the Tramway Museum, St Kilda
369 by the Bendigo Tramways, Bendigo, Victoria
373 by the Tramway Museum Society of Victoria

In popular culture 
 351 and 378 can be seen in the music video to Taiwanese pop singer Amber Fang's 1990 single "Ai qing de gu shi" (Love Story), which was filmed in Adelaide.

Notes

References

External links

Adelaide tram vehicles